Schachtner is a surname. Notable people with the surname include:

 Johann Andreas Schachtner (1731–1795), German musician and friend of Wolfgang Amadeus Mozart
 Michael Schachtner (born 1986), American basketball player
 Patty Schachtner (born 1960), American first responder and politician

See also
 Schechter